Franck Multon is a French bridge player.

Bridge accomplishments

Wins

 Bermuda Bowl (1) 1997 
 World Transnational Open Teams Championship (2) 2007, 2009 
 World Olympiad Teams Championship (1) 1996
 North American Bridge Championships (5)
 Reisinger (2) 2012, 2013 
 Spingold (2) 2011, 2012 
 Vanderbilt (1) 2010

Runners-up

 Bermuda Bowl (1) 2013 
 North American Bridge Championships (6)
 Reisinger (1) 2011 
 Spingold (4) 2014, 2015, 2016, 2019 
 Vanderbilt (1) 2014

Controversy at Winter Games 2020

Multon was dummy with his partner Pierre Zimmermann as declarer when with three cards left to play Multon was alleged to tell his partner (in French) how to play the remaining cards.
This breaks Law 43A (paragraph 1(c)) of The Laws of Duplicate Bridge 2017. The Winter Games tournament in Monaco attracted many of the world's top bridge players - the main sponsor of the tournament was the aforementioned Pierre Zimmermann.

References

External links
 
 

French contract bridge players
Monegasque contract bridge players
Bermuda Bowl players
Living people
Year of birth missing (living people)